The Public Health (Ireland) Act 1878 (41 & 42 Vict c 52) was an Act of the Parliament of the United Kingdom of Great Britain and Ireland which introduced a comprehensive code of sanitary law in Ireland.

See also
Public Health Act
Irish Poor Law

References
Vanston, George Thomas Barrett. The Law relating to Public Health in Ireland: being the Public Health (Ireland) Act, 1878, and amending Acts. With notes of all reported decisions, tables of cases and statutes, and an index. E Ponsonby. Dublin. 1892. Catalogue.
William Dudley Wodsworth. The Public Health (Ireland) Act, 1878. Alexander Thom. Dublin. 1878. Catalogue. Reviewed at (1878) 2 The Medical Press and Circular 322 (16 October).
Galligan and McGrath. "Public Health (Ireland) Act 1878". Compulsory Purchase and Compensation in Ireland: Law and Practice. Second Edition. Bloomsbury Professional. 2013. Paragraphs 4.02 to 4.09 at pages 151 to 153.

Poor Law in Britain and Ireland
United Kingdom Acts of Parliament 1878
1878 in Ireland
Acts of the Parliament of the United Kingdom concerning Ireland
Public health in the United Kingdom